Punta Maisí Lighthouse is a Cuban lighthouse located in Maisí, a municipality of Guantánamo Province. It lies in Cape Maisí, the easternmost point of Cuba.

See also
 List of lighthouses in Cuba
 Cabo San Antonio Lighthouse, the westernmost in Cuba

References

Lighthouses in Cuba
Buildings and structures in Guantánamo Province
Lighthouses completed in 1862
19th-century architecture in Cuba